Virbia luteilinea is a moth in the family Erebidae. It was described by Francis Walker in 1854. It is found in Mexico, Guatemala, Nicaragua, Panama and Colombia.

References

Moths described in 1854
lunulata